The black-headed whistler (Pachycephala monacha) is a species of bird in the family Pachycephalidae. It is found on the Aru Islands and New Guinea. Its natural habitat is subtropical or tropical moist lowland forests.

Taxonomy and systematics
Some authorities have considered the black-headed whistler to be a subspecies of the rufous whistler.

Subspecies 
Two subspecies are recognized:
 P. m. monacha – Gray, GR, 1858: Found on Aru Islands (off southwest New Guinea)
 P. m. lugubris – Salvadori, 1881: Found in central New Guinea

References

black-headed whistler
Birds of the Aru Islands
Birds of New Guinea
black-headed whistler
black-headed whistler
Taxonomy articles created by Polbot